"The Airport" is the 52nd episode of the sitcom Seinfeld. It is the 12th episode of the fourth season and aired on November 25, 1992 on NBC. This episode centers on Jerry and Elaine's differing experiences in first class and coach on the same airline flight, while George and Kramer suffer mishaps trying to pick them up at the airport.

Plot
Jerry and Elaine are flying home from St. Louis to New York after Jerry performed a show and Elaine visited her sister. Elaine objects to Jerry paying the skycap his suggested tip, arguing it is far too much. In revenge, the skycap sends her luggage on a flight to Honolulu. When their flight to John F. Kennedy International Airport is cancelled, Jerry and Elaine rebook on a flight to LaGuardia Airport, which has one seat left in first class and one in coach. Jerry claims the first class seat, arguing that Elaine has never flown first class and so cannot miss it. Elaine is uncomfortable in the small coach seats and deals with rude, obnoxious people while Jerry parties in first class with a model, Tia Van Camp, and a steady flow of complimentary wine and desserts. Elaine sneaks into first class, but is caught and returned to coach.

Due to their rebooking and a rerouting of their flight, George and Kramer go between JFK and LaGuardia to pick them up. At JFK, George takes the last copy of Time, since he believes Jerry mentioned him in his interview for the magazine. Another customer argues he has more right to the magazine since he is the cover feature. Looking at the customer's face and the headline "Caught", George realizes his companions are a police escort and so taunts him with the magazine as he is dragged away. Kramer sees a man who he believes is a former roommate, John Grossbard, who owes him $240 from twenty years ago. Kramer hatches a scheme: he and George will buy tickets for the man's flight and board it, Kramer gets his money back, and they get off the plane and return the tickets. George buys into the scheme, as it will give him frequent flier miles, and he will get his money back. However, Kramer buys non-refundable tickets, claiming the woman who sold them convinced him it was a good deal.

The two board the plane and Kramer confronts Grossbard; when the man denies knowing Kramer, Kramer attempts to reach into his pocket and grab his wallet, which creates a scene. George waits for the bathroom. When the door opens up, it is the prisoner. He grabs George, pulls him into the bathroom, and locks the door. Kramer is removed from the plane, but he escapes the security guard's grasp and runs away.

When Jerry and Elaine land, Tia gives Jerry her phone number. Elaine's bag arrives in Honolulu. Kramer comes sliding down the baggage chute. Jerry, Elaine, and Kramer leave, while George is on the airplane, flying to an unknown location, screaming for help.

Production
In the scene where Elaine is offered the kosher meal, the voice from across the aisle, claiming he had ordered it, is Larry David's. Larry Charles, the writer of the episode, makes an appearance coming out of a smelly airplane bathroom before Elaine goes in. Deck McKenzie, Jerry Seinfeld's stand-in on the show, appears as the security guard.

When confronted by the shackled prisoner in the airport gift shop, George says, "But you are, Blanche. You are in the shackles!" This is a reference to What Ever Happened to Baby Jane?, where Baby Jane Hudson delivers a similar line to Blanche Hudson, who is using a wheelchair.

References

External links

Seinfeld (season 4) episodes
1992 American television episodes
Airports in fiction
Works about flight attendants